Dichanthelium acuminatum, the tapered rosette grass, is a species of grass from the genus Dichanthelium, in North America.

Dichanthelium acuminatum forms a hybridization complex with other Dichanthelium species such as D. dichotomum, D.  sphaerocarpon, D. ovale, and D. aciculare.

Dichanthelium acuminatum has been successfully raised in cultivation for seed production.

References

acuminatum
Grasses of North America